Katrin Stjernfeldt Jammeh (born 9 May 1974) is a Swedish Social Democratic politician who has been the mayor of Malmö Municipality since 1 July 2013. She is the first woman to hold the office.

References

External links
 Her blog on the World Cities Summit Mayors Forum

1974 births
Living people
Swedish Social Democratic Party politicians
People from Skåne County
Mayors of Malmö
Women mayors of places in Sweden